The Amalgamated Society of Carpenters and Joiners (ASC&J) was a New Model Trade Union in the 1860s in the United Kingdom, representing carpenters and joiners.

History
The formation of the Society was spurred by the Stonemason's strike, 1859, which succeeded in winning a nine-hour day.  In 1860, a number of small societies formed the Amalgamated.  Robert Applegarth was the general secretary from 1862 to 1871.

The union also established branches in the United States, Australia, and Canada.  The United Brotherhood of Carpenters and Joiners of America took over its U.S. branches in 1913, and the United Brotherhood of Carpenters and Joiners took over its Australian branches in 1917.

By 1892, the union had 37,588 members, and by 1900 it had 65,000. It merged with or absorbed a number of smaller unions including the Carpenters of Dublin, the Carpenteres of Cork, the Mersey Ship Joiners and other small unions in Britain and Ireland in the 1890s.  In 1911, it merged with the Associated Carpenters and Joiners of Scotland, while in 1918 the Amalgamated Union of Cabinetmakers joined the union, which renamed itself as the Amalgamated Society of Carpenters, Cabinetmakers and Joiners.  In 1921, the union merged with the General Union of Carpenters and Joiners, forming the Amalgamated Society of Woodworkers

United States
The union established a branch in New York City in 1867.  In 1870, a second branch was opened in New York, plus new branches in St Louis and Chicago, followed in 1871 by branches in Cleveland and Fall River, Massachusetts.  It recruited principally from recent immigrants from the UK, although by the end of the century, most of its members had been born in the United States.

The United Brotherhood of Carpenters and Joiners of America was founded in 1881, and initially, the two unions co-operated.  In 1890, the ASC&J was admitted to the American Federation of Labor (AFL).  However, the United Brotherhood grew as it involved itself in industrial disputes, while the ASC&J focused on providing welfare benefits to members.  By 1900, the ASC&J in the United States had 3,011 members.  The United Brotherhood argued that the local branches of the ASC&J should merge into the United Brotherhood.  In 1903, a committee chaired by Adolph Strasser proposed the two unions merge on an equal basis; this was supported by the ASC&J, but rejected by the United Brotherhood.

In 1912, the AFL ordered that the ASC&J accept the United Brotherhood's term; when it would not, the federation suspended the British union.  The following year, the ASC&J agreed that the United Brotherhood would have jurisdiction over its members in trade matters, while the ASC&J would retain its existence and provide welfare benefits to its members.  This arrangement endured until 1923, when the United Brotherhood claimed that the ASC&J branches were seeking to regain their independence.  The large majority of ASC&J members accepted offers to take up full membership of the United Brotherhood.

Election results
The union sponsored Labour Party candidates in each Parliamentary election from 1906 onwards.

Leadership

General Secretaries
1860: J. Lea
1862: Robert Applegarth
1871: John D. Prior
1881: James S. Murchie
1888: Francis Chandler
1919: Alexander Gordon Cameron

Assistant General Secretaries
1915: Alexander Gordon Cameron
1920: Frank Wolstencroft

Footnotes

References
 175 Years of Building Trade Unionism, UCATT, 2002
 Briggs, Asa. “Robert Applegarth and the Trade Unions”, in Asa Briggs, Victorian People (1955) pp. 168–196. online

External links
Catalogue of the ASCJ archives, held at the Modern Records Centre, University of Warwick

1921 disestablishments in the United Kingdom
Defunct trade unions of the United Kingdom
Defunct trade unions in the United States
1860 establishments in the United Kingdom
Carpenters' trade unions
Defunct trade unions of Australia
British builders
Trade unions established in 1860